Henry Poole (born 31 January 1935) is an English former football player, noted for his swerving free kicks. Primarily a half back, he has the second highest number of appearances for Port Vale. He made 499 league and cup appearances for the club in a fifteen-year association from 1953 to 1968. Whilst at the club the "Valiants" won the Fourth Division title in 1958–59.

Career
Born in Stoke-on-Trent, Poole attended Carmountside Secondary Modern, alongside Terry Miles. Poole was slightly older, though the two would be teammates from their early teens, right into their 30s. After spending his youth with various clubs, Poole signed for Port Vale as an amateur in February 1953. He also appeared for Oxford City whilst on national service.

He signed professional forms with the Vale in April 1956, making his debut in a Second Division win against Middlesbrough on 28 April 1956. By 1956–57 he was a first team regular, playing 32 games, scoring his first goal for the club at Huddersfield Town on 17 November. However the club started poorly and were relegated under Freddie Steele, though Poole was described as 'one of the few rays of sunlight in an otherwise gloomy beginning'. He played 44 games in 1957–58, as the club finished fifteenth in the Third Division South, and so were invited to form the Fourth Division.

Under the stewardship of Norman Low, the "Valiants" won the Fourth Division in 1958–59, and Poole added 'flexibility and fluidity' in his 36 appearances. He also bagged 16 of Vale's record 110 goals in the league. He posted 52 appearances in 1959–60, as Vale settled in well in the Third Division. The performances he gave in his 54 games of the 1960–61 season led The Sentinels Jon Abberley to describe Poole as 'one of the best wing-halves ever produced in the Potteries'. He remained a key fixture throughout 1961–62, posting 45 appearances. He played another 47 games in 1962–63, retaining his first team place under returning manager Freddie Steele.

He was limited to 29 games in 1963–64, but returned to usual service with a 39-game season in 1964–65, as the club were relegated into the Fourth Division. He was a vital player for new manager Jackie Mudie in 1965–66, playing a total of 51 games. He then posted 34 appearances in 1966–67, before playing 35 games for Stanley Matthews in 1967–68. He was given a testimonial, shared with Terry Miles, in August 1967. At the end of the campaign both he and Miles were given free transfers to local non-League club Sandbach Ramblers, before Poole retired the following year. In all he made 499 professional appearances for Port Vale (behind only Phil Sproson and Roy Sproson in terms of most appearances for the club), scoring 79 goals.

Style of play
Former teammate Roy Sproson said that: "I always thought that as a wing-half he was a waste. He possessed two good feet, great ball control, always found space, was quick and could finish. He also used to specialise in bending the ball round the defensive wall from free-kicks long before they became fashion."

During his career Bolton Wanderers considered him as a replacement for Nat Lofthouse, and Tottenham Hotspur had a bid rejected by the Vale.

Career statistics
Source:

HonoursPort Vale'
Football League Fourth Division: 1958–59

References

1935 births
Living people
Footballers from Stoke-on-Trent
English footballers
Association football forwards
Oxford City F.C. players
Port Vale F.C. players
Sandbach Ramblers F.C. players
English Football League players